History in the Making may refer to:

 "History in the Making" (song), a song by American country music singer Darius Rucker
 History in the Making (Big Gemini album), 2008
 History in the Making (J.R. Writer album), 2006
 Myth: History in the Making, 1989